Damaschin is a Romanian-language masculine given name and a surname. It may refer to:

Damaschin Bojincă (1802–1869), Imperial Austrian-born Moldavian writer and jurist
Marian Damaschin (born 1965), Romanian retired footballer

Romanian masculine given names
Romanian-language surnames